Karl Friedrich Johannes Kuhlo (8 October 1856 in Gohfeld,  now Löhne, Germany – 16 May 1941 in Bielefeld-Bethel, Germany) together with his father Eduard Kuhlo, founded the German Protestant Posaunenchor (trombone choir/church brass ensemble) movement.
Working in collaboration with the Bielefeld instrument maker Ernst David he developed the kuhlohorn for use by the ensembles (among other brass instruments).

Further reading
 Wilhelm Ehmann: Johannes Kuhlo. Ein Spielmann Gottes. Stuttgart 1951, Luther Verlag, 6. Auflage Bielefeld 1981, ISBN 3-7858-0181-5.
 Helmut Ludwig: Johannes Kuhlo. Der Posaunengeneral. Brunnen Verlag, Gießen/Basel 1966 (Digitalisat auf www.archive.org).
 
 Christof Windhorst: Eduard und Johannes Kuhlo. In: Beiträge zur Heimatkunde der Städte Löhne und Bad Oeynhausen, Heft 12: Beiträge zur Kirchengeschichte des 19. und 20. Jahrhunderts – Erweckungsbewegung und Kirchenkampf. Löhne 1987, S. 85–103.
 Joachim Thalmann (ed.): Johannes Kuhlo. Mitarbeiter am Psalm 150. Luther-Verlag, Bielefeld 1991, ISBN 3-7858-0336-2.
 Johannes Kuhlo. In: Horst Dietrich Schlemm (ed.): Beiträge zur Geschichte evangelischer Posaunenarbeit, Lieferung 2: Zwölf Männer prägten die Posaunenarbeit. Gütersloh 1991, ISBN 3-579-03021-3, S. 28–44.
 
 Wolfgang Schnabel: Drei große Förderer der evangelischen Posaunenchorbewegung. Johannes Kuhlo, Adolf Müller, Wilhelm Ehmann. Brockmeyer, Bochum 1994, ISBN 3-8196-0241-0.
 Reinhard Neumann: Pastor Johannes Kuhlo (1856–1941). Seine politischen Einstellungen als Vorsteher der Westfälischen Diakonenanstalt Nazareth von 1893–1922 und darüber hinaus. In: Jahrbuch für Westfälische Kirchengeschichte 102, 2006, S. 367–403 (unkorrigiertes Manuskript des zugrundeliegenden Vortrags).
 Wolfgang Schnabel: Johannes Kuhlo (1856–1941): Preuße, Pfarrer, Posaunengeneral. In: Jürgen Kampmann (ed.): Protestantismus in Preußen, Bd. IV Vom Ersten Weltkrieg bis zur deutschen Teilung. Frankfurt a. Main 2011, ISBN 978-3-86921-036-0, S. 31–48.
 Eckard Struckmeier: "Wie der Hirsch lechzt nach frischem Wasser ...". Geschichte der Kirchengemeinde Hüllhorst vom Mittelalter bis zur Gegenwart. In: Heinz-Ulrich Kammeier, Wolfgang Riechmann, Bert Wiegel (ed.): Quellen und Schrifttum zur Kulturgeschichte des Wiehengebirgsraumes, Reihe A Band 6. Espelkamp 1996, ISBN 3-89646-900-2.

German classical trombonists
Male trombonists
1856 births
1941 deaths